Idaho Amendment 2 of 2006 is an amendment to the Idaho Constitution that made it unconstitutional for the state to recognize or perform same-sex marriages or civil unions.

The text of the amendment states:
A marriage between a man and a woman is the only domestic legal union that shall be valid or recognized in this state.

The amendment was passed 53–17 by the Idaho House of Representatives on February 6, 2006, and 26–9 by the Idaho Senate on February 15, 2006. It was subsequently approved by 63% of voters in a referendum.

On May 13, 2014, a United States magistrate judge struck down Amendment 2 as unconstitutional. Idaho Governor C.L. "Butch" Otter has requested a stay and plans to appeal the ruling to the United States Court of Appeals for the Ninth Circuit in San Francisco.

Result

Results by county

Source: Idaho Secretary of State

See also
LGBT rights in Idaho

References

External links
 The Money Behind the 2006 Marriage Amendments -- National Institute on Money in State Politics
 The amendment on ballotpedia.org
 Link to the amendment

U.S. state constitutional amendments banning same-sex unions
LGBT in Idaho
2006 in LGBT history
2006 Idaho elections
2006 ballot measures
Idaho ballot measures
Same-sex marriage ballot measures in the United States